is an Apollo asteroid some  in diameter and a Mars-crosser asteroid first observed on 20 November 2007, by Andrea Boattini of the Catalina Sky Survey. Early observations of  caused excitement amongst the scientific community when it was estimated as having as high as a 1 in 25 chance of colliding with Mars on 30 January 2008. However, by 9 January 2008, additional observations allowed NASA's Near Earth Object Program (NEOP) to reduce the uncertainty region resulting in only a 1-in-10,000 chance of impact.  most likely passed Mars at a distance of 6.5 Mars radii. Due to this relatively small distance and the uncertainty level of the prior observations, the gravitational effects of Mars on its trajectory are unknown and, according to Steven Chesley of NASA's Jet Propulsion Laboratory Near-Earth Object program,  is currently considered 'lost' (see lost asteroids).

Discovery 

The asteroid was discovered on 20 November 2007 by Andrea Boattini of the NASA-funded Catalina Sky Survey on Mount Lemmon, near Tucson, Arizona, United States, using a 1.5-meter telescope. It was discovered in the constellation Taurus at an apparent magnitude of +20. This is about 400,000 times fainter than most people can see with the naked eye on a dark night far from city lights. It was discovered nineteen days after passing near Earth. By the time it arrived at Mars it had an apparent magnitude of roughly +26 and therefore appeared over 100 times fainter than at the time of discovery.

Mars encounter: chance of impact

Timeline of observations and events 
 1 November 2007: Nineteen days before its discovery, this small asteroid passed within 7.5 million km (5 million miles or 0.0476 AU) of the Earth.
20 November 2007: The asteroid was first discovered by Andrea Boattini of the Catalina Sky Survey.
It was estimated by NASA's Near Earth Object Program (NEOP) to have a 1-in-75 chance of colliding with Mars on 30 January 2008 at approximately 10:55 UT. It was thought it would pass about 50,000 km (0.00034AU) from Mars.
 28 December 2007: NASA scientists at the Near-Earth Object program office at JPL announced they had found  in 3 precovery images from 8 November 2007. The refined orbit placed the odds of a Mars impact at 1-in-25. The uncertainty region was reduced from 1 million km to roughly 400,000 km. The best fit trajectory had the asteroid passing within 21,000 km of Mars and only 16,000 km from the moon Deimos. The pre-discovery observations were located by Andy Puckett in the archive of the Sloan Digital Sky Survey II at the Apache Point Observatory.
 2 January 2008: NASA scientists revised the probability of an impact with Mars to 1-in-28 after more observations were reported by Bill Ryan with the 2.4-meter telescope at New Mexico Tech's Magdalena Ridge Observatory. The uncertainty region was reduced to roughly 200,000 km and still intersected Mars, but the most likely path moved a little farther away from the planet.
 8 January 2008: NASA scientists revised the probability of an impact with Mars to 1-in-40 after refinements to the analysis of the Sloan precovery observations and observations with the 3.5 meter telescope at the Calar Alto Observatory in Spain. The uncertainty region was reduced by a factor of 3.
 9 January 2008: Following several new observations, NASA reduced the uncertainty region and effectively ruled out a Mars collision. The chance of collision became only 1-in-10,000 (0.01%). The best estimate was that around 12:00 UTC the asteroid passed about 26,000 km (0.00017AU) from the planet's center (about 7 Mars radii from the surface). Analyses show there is no possibility of an impact with either Mars or Earth in the next century.

This trend of increasing probability of impact followed by a dramatic decrease is typical as uncertainties are gradually reduced. In December 2004, a similar trend was observed with 99942 Apophis where the predicted probability of impact with Earth in 2029 at one point reached as high as 2.7%.

Estimates of resulting impact 

If the asteroid had collided with Mars, it would have hit with a velocity of about 13.5 km/s (8.4 miles per second), and would have produced an explosion equivalent to about 3 megatons of TNT. A crater this size would be equal to the size of the Meteor Crater in Arizona, United States. NASA officials say if it had hit Mars, it would have done so north of the location of the Opportunity rover.

 is roughly the size of the cometary object that caused the Tunguska event in 1908, in remote central Siberia, Russia. Due to the Earth's greater gravity, an impact with the power of Tunguska is expected to occur once every few hundred years. Since Mars has only 1/10 the mass to attract objects, these types of impacts occur roughly every one thousand years on Mars.

Future encounters 

In July 2003, the asteroid passed within 0.012 AU of Mars. The exact fate of  following the January 2008 Mars encounter is unknown although it likely passed Mars at a distance of 6.5 Mars radii. Mars, unlike Jupiter, is not big enough to eject the asteroid from the Solar System; however, the gravitation effect from the encounter on the asteroid's trajectory is uncertain and the asteroid is currently considered 'lost'. Assuming  passed Mars safely, its low inclination to the ecliptic of only 2.3 degrees and high eccentricity of 0.6 could cause it to swing close to Mars or Earth for years or decades into the future.

See also 
 C/2013 A1 - Comet that passed extremely close to Mars on 19 October 2014
 Comet Shoemaker–Levy 9 - Jupiter impact 1994
 Impact events on Mars

References

External links 
 CNEOS – Center for Near Earth Object Studies, JPL–NASA
 A Meteoroid Hits the Moon (25 cm wide) on 2 May 2006
 Gravity Simulator Diagram of Mars Passage (based on 23 December orbital elements)
 Computing Crater Size from Projectile Diameter (H. Jay Melosh and Ross A. Beyer)
 Solar System Collisions (Send an asteroid or comet hurtling toward your favorite planet!)
 Science Friday Podcast with Don Yeomans (2007-12-28)
 Possible Asteroid Strike on Mars: Scientific Paydirt (2008-01-03)
 
 
 

Minor planet object articles (unnumbered)
Discoveries by Andrea Boattini
Mars impact events
Lost minor planets
20071120